The Peter Pyramid is a book published in 1986 by Dr. Laurence J. Peter, who also wrote The Peter Principle published in 1969.

In this book he turns his attention to proliferating bureaucracies, burgeoning officialdom and does for the system what the Peter Principle did for the individual.

With a host of unfortunate examples for real life, Dr. Peter shows how major organizations are constructed upside down, with the point of operation all but invisible beneath the bulk of a top-heavy administration.

Cutting through the red tape he suggests, with humour and wisdom, dozens of ways to simplify meaningless complexity and stop the current procession of the bland leading the bland.

Contents
 Pyramid Power
 Peter Pyramid
 Proliferating Pathology
 Progressive Processes
 Pyramid Proficiency

1986 non-fiction books
Business books